The Zambian mole-rat (Fukomys amatus) is a species of rodent in the family Bathyergidae. It is found in Zambia and the Democratic Republic of the Congo. It was formerly considered a subspecies of Cryptomys hottentotus.

References

Fukomys
Mammals of Zambia
Mammals of the Democratic Republic of the Congo
Mammals described in 1907